Brusenets is a rural locality (a village) in Gorodishchenskoye Rural Settlement, Nyuksensky District, Vologda Oblast, Russia. The population was 129 as of 2002.

Geography 
Brusenets is located 60 km southwest of Nyuksenitsa (the district's administrative centre) by road. Pustynya is the nearest rural locality.

References 

Rural localities in Nyuksensky District